Robert John Porcher Broughton (11 July 1816 – 15 June 1911) was an English amateur cricketer who played first-class cricket from 1836 to 1864.

Robert Broughton was born at Farnham in Surrey and educated at Harrow School and Clare College, Cambridge. Mainly associated with Cambridge University and Marylebone Cricket Club (MCC), he made 26 known appearances in first-class matches.  Broughton was an outstanding fielder who specialised at cover point. His grandson, John Cowley, also played first-class cricket.

Broughton died at Callipers Hall, Chipperfield, Hertfordshire in 1911.

References

1816 births
1911 deaths
English cricketers
English cricketers of 1826 to 1863
Marylebone Cricket Club cricketers
Cambridge University cricketers
People educated at Harrow School
Alumni of Clare College, Cambridge
Cambridge Town Club cricketers
The Bs cricketers
Gentlemen of England cricketers